Aerophilus is a genus of parasitoid wasps belonging to the family Braconidae. As members of the subfamily Agathidinae, they are koinobiont endoparasitoids of caterpillars. The host is attacked as an early instar, but not consumed and killed until the host is about to pupate. Nearly all species of Aerophilus have a narrow host range, attacking only one caterpillar species. However, the host range of the genus as a whole is quite broad, including many families of Lepidoptera.

Several species have been used in biological control programs, but with minimal success.
Aerophilus has a world-wide distribution. Thirty-five species have been described from the United States and Canada.

References

Braconidae genera